Lewis Albert Goram (2 July 1926 – January 1989) was a Scottish professional football goalkeeper. He played in the Scottish Football League for Leith Athletic and Third Lanark and in the English Football League for Bury.

Goram played for Leith Athletic before joining Hibernian in 1948. He did not play for the Hibernian first team and moved to Third Lanark in 1949, featuring in 9 league games. In 1950 he moved to Bury where he played 114 league games. On leaving Bury he played for Mossley and Buxton before retiring from the game.

His son, Andy, was also a professional football goalkeeper and was capped for Scotland 43 times. He also had a daughter, Diane, with his first wife June.

References

1926 births
1989 deaths
Footballers from Edinburgh
Scottish footballers
Association football goalkeepers
Leith Athletic F.C. players
Hibernian F.C. players
Third Lanark A.C. players
Bury F.C. players
Mossley A.F.C. players
Buxton F.C. players
Macclesfield Town F.C. players
English Football League players